Philip Pleydell-Bouverie (21 October 1788 – 27 May 1872), was a British Whig politician.

Background
Pleydell-Bouverie was a younger son of Jacob Pleydell-Bouverie, 2nd Earl of Radnor, by his wife the Hon. Anne, daughter of Anthony Duncombe, 1st Baron Feversham. The family home was Coleshill House in Berkshire (now Oxfordshire).

Political career
Pleydell-Bouverie was returned to Parliament for Cockermouth in 1830, a seat he held until the following year, and then represented Downton until 1832. He remained out of the House of Commons for 24 years, but in 1857 he was elected as one of three Members of Parliament for Berkshire. He held the seat until 1865.

Family
Pleydell-Bouverie married Maria (11 June 1782-27 Nov 1862), daughter of Sir William à Court, 1st Baronet, in 1811. They had five children:

Letitia Anne, who married Rev. Charles Deedes, grandson of Sir Brook Bridges, 3rd Baronet. They had one son, Rev. Philip Deedes who by his wife Josephine Parker had one son, General Sir Charles Parker Deedes.
Maria (d. 9 Oct 1903), who married Rev. William Pitt Trevelyan, grandson of Sir John Trevelyan, 4th Baronet and Sir Richard Neave, 1st Baronet. They had four sons.
Unknown daughter who probably was stillborn.
Caroline (d. 8 Feb 1867), married Rev. Hyde Wyndham Beadon, descendant of Bishop Richard Beadon. They had no known issue.
Philip (21 Apr 1821-10 March 1890), married Jane Seymour great great granddaughter of Sir Edward Seymour, 5th Baronet. They had eight children, including their daughter Janet (wife of Sir Frederick Peel), Frances (wife of the Hon. Alexander Campbell, son of John Campbell, 2nd Earl Cawdor) and Alys (married to Rev. Arundell St John-Mildmay, a descendant of Sir Henry St John-Mildmay, 3rd Baronet and PM George Grenville).

She died in November 1862. Pleydell-Bouverie survived her by ten years and died in May 1872, aged 83.

References

External links 
 

1788 births
1872 deaths
Younger sons of earls
High Sheriffs of Somerset
Members of the Parliament of the United Kingdom for Berkshire
UK MPs 1830–1831
UK MPs 1831–1832
UK MPs 1857–1859
UK MPs 1859–1865
Whig (British political party) MPs
People from Vale of White Horse (district)